Edwin John "Whitey" Kachan (September 15, 1925 – March 7, 1993) was an American professional basketball player.

A 6'2" guard from DePaul University, Kachan played one season (1948–49) in the Basketball Association of America as a member of the Chicago Stags and Minneapolis Lakers.  He averaged 2.2 points per game and won a championship with the Lakers.

BAA career statistics

Regular season

Playoffs

External links

Whitey Kachan's obituary

1925 births
1993 deaths
American men's basketball players
Chicago Stags draft picks
Chicago Stags players
DePaul Blue Demons men's basketball players
Guards (basketball)
Minneapolis Lakers players
Basketball players from Chicago